NLY or NLy may refer to:

 Annaly Capital Management (NYSE: NLY)
 Niki airline (ICAO code: NLY)